Chilchota can refer to:
 Chilchota (municipality), municipality in Michoacán, Mexico
 Chilchota Alimentos, Mexican food company